The Dr. C. B. Wilson House (also known as the Office of Fuller, Breslau, and Stinnett Attorneys) is a historic home in Sarasota, Florida. On March 22, 1984, it was added to the U.S. National Register of Historic Places.  It originally was located at 235 South Orange Avenue. In 2004, the house was planned to be demolished for the construction of a bank on the site. Funds were raised, and the house was moved to 4012 Honore Avenue inside of Urfer Family Park. Today, the house is open for self-guided tours to the public.

References

External links

 Florida's Office of Cultural and Historical Programs
 Urfer Family Park

Houses on the National Register of Historic Places in Sarasota County, Florida
Houses in Sarasota, Florida
Houses completed in 1913
Vernacular architecture in Florida
1913 establishments in Florida